FK Standard Sumgayit was an Azerbaijani football club. They played in the AFFA Supreme League, the top division in Azerbaijani football. Founded in Baku, the club moved to Sumgayit on 12 June 2009, which changed also club's name to Standard Sumgayit.

In 2010, club's owners announced that club will be dissolved and they will not be participating in Azerbaijan First Division.

Stadium

Standard played their home games at the 15,350 capacity Mehdi Huseynzade Stadium in Sumqayit.

League and domestic cup history

Individual records

Appearances

Goals

Managers

External links
 Official Website
 Standard Baku at AFFA.AZ
 Standard Baku at UEFA.COM

References

 
Football clubs in Azerbaijan
Defunct football clubs in Azerbaijan
Football clubs in Baku
Sport in Sumgait
Association football clubs established in 2006
Association football clubs disestablished in 2010
2006 establishments in Azerbaijan
2010 disestablishments in Azerbaijan